Zachary Robert Stewart (born September 28, 1986) is an American former professional baseball pitcher. He played in Major League Baseball (MLB) for the Toronto Blue Jays, Chicago White Sox, and Boston Red Sox, and in the KBO League for the NC Dinos.

Amateur career 
Stewart attended Holliday High School.  He attended Angelo State University before transferring to North Central Texas College where he pitched in 2006 and 2007. He pitched for Texas Tech University in 2008. Stewart became the third former North Central Texas College player to debut in MLB, after Craig Stansberry and J. R. Towles.

Professional career

Cincinnati Reds 
Stewart was drafted by the Cincinnati Reds in the third round of the 2008 Major League Baseball draft out of Texas Tech University.

Toronto Blue Jays 
On August 1, 2009 the Reds traded Stewart, along with Edwin Encarnación and Josh Roenicke, to the Toronto Blue Jays for Scott Rolen. He was the Toronto Blue Jays top prospect prior to the 2010 Toronto Blue Jays season according to Baseball America.

On June 14, 2011, Stewart was called up from the Double-A New Hampshire Fisher Cats to replace Kyle Drabek, who was optioned to the Triple-A Las Vegas 51s. He made his career debut on June 16, 2011 against the Baltimore Orioles, pitching 7 innings, giving up 7 hits, 2 earned runs, 1 walk and 4 strikeouts. After making 3 starts, Stewart was optioned back to Double-A New Hampshire on June 28, 2011.

Chicago White Sox 
On July 27, 2011, Stewart was traded to the Chicago White Sox with Jason Frasor for Edwin Jackson and Mark Teahen. Stewart was called up to the White Sox on August 6, 2011 and earned his first MLB victory going 6.1 innings giving up 1 run on 8 hits striking out 2 in a 6–1 victory over the Minnesota Twins.

On September 5, 2011, Stewart threw 7 perfect innings before giving up a hit to Minnesota Twins infielder Danny Valencia. Stewart then went on to retire the next six batters as the White Sox swept a double header winning 4–0.

Boston Red Sox 
On June 24, 2012, Stewart was traded to the Boston Red Sox with Brent Lillibridge for Kevin Youkilis and cash. He was sent to the Triple-A Pawtucket Red Sox. Stewart was recalled from Pawtucket on August 29 in order to start that night against the Los Angeles Angels. The next day, Stewart was sent back to Pawtucket to make room for Daniel Bard. On November 20, Stewart was designated for assignment with four others.

Pittsburgh Pirates 
On November 28, 2012, the Pittsburgh Pirates announced that they had acquired Stewart from the Red Sox in exchange for a player to be named later. The Pirates sent pitcher Kyle Kaminska to the Red Sox to complete the trade. The Pirates designated Stewart for assignment on January 17, 2013.

Return to Chicago
Stewart was claimed by the Chicago White Sox on January 24, 2013.  Stewart spent the 2013 season with the Triple-A Charlotte Knights.

Atlanta Braves 
Stewart was traded to the Atlanta Braves on March 10, 2014, in exchange for cash considerations. he started the 2014 season with the Triple-A Gwinnett Braves.

Los Angeles Angels of Anaheim
On January 27, 2015, Stewart signed a minor league contract with the Los Angeles Angels of Anaheim.

NC Dinos
On June 10, 2015, Stewart signed a contract with the NC Dinos.

Baltimore Orioles
On January 6, 2017, Stewart signed a minor league contract with the Baltimore Orioles. On May 3, 2017, the Orioles released Stewart from his minor league contract.

New Britain Bees
On March 20, 2018, Stewart signed with the New Britain Bees of the independent Atlantic League of Professional Baseball.

Toronto Blue Jays (second stint)
On July 5, 2018, Stewart signed a minor league contract with the Toronto Blue Jays and was assigned to the Triple-A Buffalo Bisons. He elected free agency on November 2, 2018.

New Britain Bees (second stint)
On March 19, 2019, Stewart signed with the New Britain Bees of the Atlantic League of Professional Baseball. On May 21, 2019, Stewart announced his retirement from professional baseball.

Post-playing career 
As of 2020, Stewart is an assistant coach in the Toronto Blue Jays organization.

References

External links 

 Zach Stewart at the Texas Tech Red Raiders official athletic website
 Zach Stewart at KBO official website 

1986 births
Living people
American expatriate baseball players in Canada
American expatriate baseball players in South Korea
Buffalo Bisons (minor league) players
Baseball players from Texas
Boston Red Sox players
Carolina Mudcats players
Charlotte Knights players
Chicago White Sox players
Dayton Dragons players
Gulf Coast Braves players
Gwinnett Braves players
Las Vegas 51s players
Louisville Bats players
NC Dinos players
NCTC Lions baseball players
New Britain Bees players
New Hampshire Fisher Cats players
Pawtucket Red Sox players
Salt Lake Bees players
Sarasota Reds players
Texas Tech Red Raiders baseball players
Toronto Blue Jays players